Andrew Frost (born 17 April 1981) is a British athlete who competes in the hammer throw. He has a personal best distance of 72.79 metres.

Athletics career
He competed for England at the 2006 Commonwealth Games in Melbourne, Australia and competed for Scotland at the 2010 Commonwealth Games in Delhi, India. He just missed bronze medals by finishing 4th in both events. He also competed for Scotland at the 2014 Commonwealth Games in Glasgow, Scotland finishing 9th.

He is a four time British Champion, winning titles in 2005, 2006, 2007 and 2013.

References

1981 births
Living people
British male hammer throwers
Scottish male hammer throwers
English male hammer throwers
Commonwealth Games competitors for England
Commonwealth Games competitors for Scotland
Athletes (track and field) at the 2006 Commonwealth Games
Athletes (track and field) at the 2010 Commonwealth Games
British Athletics Championships winners
AAA Championships winners